Brigadier-General Lucius Eugene Polk (July 10, 1833 – December 1, 1892) was a senior officer of the Confederate States Army who commanded infantry in the Western Theater of the American Civil War. He was a nephew of Leonidas Polk.

Early life
Polk was born in Salisbury, North Carolina. When he was two years of age, the family moved near Columbia, Tennessee. Polk attended the University of Virginia in 1850-51, before settling in Helena, Arkansas, where he was a planter.

Civil War
In 1861, Polk enlisted in the Yell Rifles as a private under Patrick Cleburne, who he served under during most of the War. At the Battle of Shiloh, then Junior Second Lieutenant Polk was wounded in the face. He was promoted to colonel of the 15th Arkansas Infantry Regiment following Shiloh. When Cleburne was promoted to divisional command, Polk was appointed brigadier general to date from December 13, 1862. Polk took part in fighting at Stones River, Chickamauga, Chattanooga, and in the Atlanta Campaign. In June 1864, Polk was severely wounded (the fourth time during the war) at the Battle of Kennesaw Mountain and was honorably discharged from the Army.

Post-war career
Polk returned to Columbia after his wounding at Kennesaw. He served as a delegate to the 1884 Democratic National Convention in Chicago. In 1887 he was elected to the Tennessee Senate.

Death and legacy
Polk received high praise from Confederate soldier Sam Watkins, who wrote of him in his book Co. Aytch: "In every battle he was engaged in, he led his men to victory, or held the enemy at bay, while the surge of battle was against us; he always seemed the successful general, who would snatch victory out of the very jaws of defeat.  In every battle, Polk's brigade, of Cleburne's division, almost making the name of Cleburne as the Stonewall of the West.  Polk was to Cleburne what Murat or the Old Guard was to Napoleon."

Polk died in Columbia, Tennessee, and is buried at St. John's Church Cemetery at nearby Ashwood. His son Rufus King Polk was a Congressman from Pennsylvania.

See also

List of American Civil War generals (Confederate)

Notes

References
 Eicher, John H., and David J. Eicher, Civil War High Commands. Stanford: Stanford University Press, 2001. .
 Sifakis, Stewart. Who Was Who in the Civil War. New York: Facts On File, 1988. .
 Warner, Ezra J. Generals in Gray: Lives of the Confederate Commanders. Baton Rouge: Louisiana State University Press, 1959. .

External links
 

1833 births
1892 deaths
Confederate States Army brigadier generals
People of North Carolina in the American Civil War
People of Tennessee in the American Civil War
People of Arkansas in the American Civil War
Lucius E.
People from Salisbury, North Carolina
People from Helena, Arkansas
People from Maury County, Tennessee
Tennessee state senators
19th-century American politicians